ago verbo hacer en presente simple primera persona.

References

Populated places in Kara Region
Doufelgou Prefecture